Xylota sylvarum is a common Palearctic species of hoverfly.

Description
External images
For terms see Morphology of Diptera 
Wing length 9–12 mm. Thorax blackish. Four anterior legs partly yellow. Abdomen black with golden patches (adpressed golden hair). The male genitalia are figured by Hippa (1968). The larva is illustrated in colour by Rotheray (1994) ). 
See references for determination.

Distribution
Palearctic Fennoscandia South to Iberia. Ireland eastwards through North Europe on to Siberia and the Pacific coast.

Biology
Old woodland species running on the foliage of bushes and shrubs and on tree stumps. The larvae feed in damp, fungus-ridden decaying wood of Abies, Fagus and Quercus trunks and stumps, usually beneath the bark. The major habitat may be decaying tree roots...

References

Diptera of Europe
Eristalinae
Insects described in 1758
Articles containing video clips
Taxa named by Carl Linnaeus